The Da Vinci family is an Italian family from Vinci, Tuscany.

Origins 

The family name derives from Vinci, Tuscany, the place of origin of the family.

History

Family tree

Notable members 
 Piero da Vinci (1426-1504), father of Leonardo da Vinci. 
 Leonardo da Vinci (1452–1519), Italian polymath of the High Renaissance.
 Pierino da Vinci (1530–1553), Italian sculptor, nephew of Leonardo da Vinci.
 Lorenzo da Vinci, son of Piero da Vinci
 Giuliano da Vinci (1478-1525), son of Piero da Vinci

See also 
 Florentine Republic
 Medici
 Museo leonardiano di Vinci

References

Bibliography
 R. Cianchi, Vinci, Leonardo e la sua famiglia (con appendice di documenti inediti), Milano, Industrie Grafiche Italiane Stucchi, s.d. (1952).
 Anonimo, L'abitazione della famiglia di Leonardo a Firenze, in Raccolta Vinciana, IX, 1913–17.
 G. Uzielli, Ricerche intorno a Leonardo da Vinci, G. Pellas, Firenze, 1872.
 F. Moeller, Ser Giuliano di ser Piero da Vinci e le sue relazioni con Leonardo, in Rivista d'Arte, XVI, 1934.
 R. Casarosa e Alessandro Guidotti, Notariato e storia delle arti a Firenze nel Medioevo, in Il notaio nella civiltà fiorentina, Vallecchi, Firenze, 1984, scheda 278 (A. Guidotti).
 Milena Magnano, Leonardo, collana I Geni dell'arte, Mondadori Arte, Milano 2007. 
 Angelo Paratico, "Leonardo Da Vinci. A Chinese Scholar Lost in Renaissance Italy" Lascar Publishing, 2015.

Italian families
History of Italy
History of Tuscany
Italian culture